The term Calabrian diaspora refers to the migration of Calabrians away from Calabria in Southern Italy. It is estimated that five million Italians immigrated to the U.S. between the unification of Italy around 1870 and the Great Depression around 1930. World War I in 1914 marked a surge in the level of immigration. Italians continued to leave Italy in sizable numbers, notably during the periods between World Wars I and II, and again after World War II ended in 1945, a period of immigration that lasted into the 1980s.

Numbers
In 1876 Italy suffered an economic depression, and an eruption of Mt. Vesuvius, which erupted again in 1906. followed shortly after by volcanic eruptions of Vesuvius and Etna. The Calabrian population consisted largely of farmers, subsisting often on poor farmland, in an era of high taxes and low incomes. The people in the Italian south were hard hit by the consequences of these events, which included a flu pandemic and malarial outbreaks. Already poor, the population in Calabria very hard hit. By the 1920s, of the five million Italians who had moved to the U.S., over three quarters were from the south, the majority of those originating in Calabria and Sicily.

The First World War disrupted emigration from all parts of Europe, including Italy. Immediately post-war, the condition of European economies was so bad that emigration picked up almost immediately.

The extreme economic difficulties of post-war Italy and the severe internal tensions within the nation (which led to the rise of Fascism) "pushed" 614,000 emigrants away in 1920, half of them going to the United States. ("Push" as opposed to the economic "pull" of a foreign nation in need of immigrant labor—the case in earlier decades.) When the Fascists came to power in 1922 there was a general slowdown in the flow of emigrants from Italy—eventually. However, during the first five years of Fascism, one and one-half million people left Italy. That is 300,000 persons per year, a number quite comparable to the early years of the 20th century. Even as late as 1930, 300,000 emigrants left Italy in that single year. By that time, the nature of the emigrants had changed; there was, for example, a marked increase in the rise of relatives of non-working age who were moving to be with their families who had gone before.
A destination privileged by the emigrants between 1915 and 1940 : is the western Europe (except Germany) and in particular France, where more than 2 million Italians (and thus a Calabrian proportion is always comparable with those of the first period) will go.

For the last period of migration, the tendency inverse between the south and north: 65% of the Italian migrants are southern Italy. Also, 2.3 million Calabrians will leave their country.
But between 1945 and 1985, the destinations change. So formerly America was the first destination, as from 1970, Italian stopped to go there because of the immigration control. And since 1960, South America is not more coveted by the emigrants. For the rebuilding after the war, the Europe receive a great number of Italians: in France, in Switzerland, in Belgium but especially, in Germany, which will accommodate close to 1 million from 1950 to 1960. Lastly, a new destination receives emigrants between 1950 and 1970, it is Australia, but it is few compared with Europe.

Causes of emigration
Historically, there are many reasons why people decide to leave their homes. Among these are political or religious persecution, overcrowding at home, and poverty. The last reason is, no doubt, the one responsible for the great "Italian diaspora." Much of Italy—and especially southern Italy—at the time of unification was rural, and land management practices—again, especially in the south—did not easily convince farmers to stay on the land and work the soil.

The unification of Italy broke down the feudal land system that had survived in the south since the Middle Ages, especially where land had been the inalienable property of aristocrats, religious bodies, or the king. The breakdown of feudalism, however, and redistribution of land did not necessarily lead to small farmers in the south winding up with land of their own, land they could work and profit from. Many remained landless, and plots grew smaller and smaller (and, thus, more and more unproductive) as land was subdivided among heirs.

Mezzadria –sharefarming—where tenant families got a plot to work from an owner and kept a reasonable share of the profits—was more prevalent in central Italy, which is one of the reasons there was less emigration from that part of Italy. The south lacked entrepreneurs, and absentee landlords were common. Although owning land was the basic yardstick of wealth, farming in the south was socially despised. People invested not in agricultural equipment, but in such things as low-risk state bonds. Thus, when one talks about "Italian diaspora" it is best not to view it as a single Italy-wide phenomenon affecting all regions of the nation equally. In the second phase of emigration—1900 to World War I—most emigrants were from the south and most of them were from rural areas, driven off the land by inefficient land management policies.

It was typical that the countryside lost a larger share of its population than the cities during these waves of emigration. A notable exception is the city of Naples. Until unification, Naples had been influential for several centuries. At the time of unification, Naples was the seat of government for the Kingdom of the Two Sicilies. 4  The disrupted bureaucracy and financial situation encouraged unemployment. Also, in the early 1880s, grave epidemics of cholera struck the city, causing many people to leave. The epidemics were then the driving force behind the decision to rebuild entire sections of the city, an undertaking known as the "risanamento" (lit. "making healthy again") and one that lasted until World War I. That process of tearing down and rebuilding also disrupted urban life and became another reason for many to leave the city.

See also
 Diaspora
 Italian people
 Italian diaspora
 Calabria
 Calabrian languages

External links
 Statistical Data on the Italians in the world
 Italian Diaspora
 Federazione Italiana Lavoratori Emigranti e Famiglie
 A.S.E.I. Archivio Storico Emigrazione Italiana
 Federazione Italiana Emigrazione Immigrazione
 stats 3
 stats 2
 stats 1
 Destination of italians migrants 
 Il più grande esodo migratorio della storia moderna
 Calabresi The Calabrians in the worlds
 “Our calabrians heritage”
 Calabrian genealogy

 
European diasporas